Thalotia khlimax is a species of sea snail, a marine gastropod mollusk in the family Trochidae, the top snails.

Description
The height of an adult shell attains 6 mm.

Distribution
This marine species occurs off the Austral Islands and French Polynesia.

References

External links
 To World Register of Marine Species
 
 Vilvens, C. (2012). New species and new records of Seguenzioidea and Trochoidea (Gastropoda) from French Polynesia. Novapex. 13 (1): 1-23

khlimax
Gastropods described in 2012